John Baldwin was an American politician from Appleton City, Missouri, who served in the Missouri Senate from 1911 to 1917. Baldwin was a wealthy farmer and ranch-owner, with properties both in Missouri and New Mexico.

Baldwin died of old age in his home in Appleton.

References

1843 births
Democratic Party Missouri state senators
People from Appleton City, Missouri
1934 deaths